Pryor Allan Gibson III is a government official in North Carolina. He served as a Democratic member of the North Carolina House of Representatives representing the state's sixty-ninth House district, including constituents in Anson, Montgomery and Union counties.  A businessman from Wadesboro, North Carolina, Gibson was serving in his eighth term in the state House when, in 2011, he announced he would resign to become Gov. Bev Perdue's senior adviser for governmental affairs.

In 2020, he was appointed as Assistant Secretary of the North Carolina Department of Commerce to lead its Division of Employment Security.

Electoral history

2010

2008

2006

2004

2002

2000

References

External links

|-

|-

Living people
Year of birth missing (living people)
People from Wadesboro, North Carolina
21st-century American politicians
Democratic Party members of the North Carolina House of Representatives